Hadi Manafi (born 1941) is an Iranian politician, physician, and general surgeon. He was assigned as the third minister of health of Iran from 1980-1984.

References

1941 births
Living people
Iranian politicians
Place of birth missing (living people)
Date of birth missing (living people)
Heads of Department of Environment (Iran)